Anna Domeij (born June 27, 1987) is a Swedish curler. She was second for the Swedish team at the 2008 World Junior Curling Championships in Östersund, winning a silver medal. She is second for the Swedish team at the 2010 Ford World Women's Curling Championship in Swift Current, Canada.

References

External links
 

Swedish female curlers
Living people
1987 births